Michael Hines is a television and film director based in Scotland. He has directed and produced Chewin' the Fat, a Scottish sketch show, and directed all 62 episodes of Still Game as well as hundreds of hours of television and short films including Instant Credit starring Billy Boyd. He was a committee member for BAFTA Scotland in 2017–18.
In 2019 he was awarded an Outstanding Achievement Award from Bafta Scotland for his work on Still Game. He is currently directing his first feature film Man and Witch.

References

External links

Still Game website
profile at sitcom.co.uk

Year of birth missing (living people)
Living people
Scottish television directors
Scottish film directors